Graubner is a surname. Notable people with the surname include:

Carl-Alexander Graubner (born 1957), German civil engineer and professor
Gotthard Graubner (1930–2013), German painter
Jan Graubner (born 1948), Czech Roman Catholic archbishop
Reinhard Graubner (1915–1986), German Luftwaffe pilot

See also
Grabner
Graebner